The House at 47 Sargent Street in Newton, Massachusetts, is one of the city's finest Stick style houses.  The -story wood-frame house was built in 1879.  It has irregular, asymmetrical massing, with a gables with a variety of shapes and decorations adding complexity to its roof line.  Patterned shingles are used to vary the wall decoration, and Stick style decoration is liberally applied.  The main entrance, flanked by leaded sidelight windows, is set under a porch with patterned red and gray slate roof, and a projecting gabled section.

The house was listed on the National Register of Historic Places in 1986.

See also
 National Register of Historic Places listings in Newton, Massachusetts

References

Houses on the National Register of Historic Places in Newton, Massachusetts
Queen Anne architecture in Massachusetts
Houses completed in 1879